High Brows is a 1929 novel by Scottish writer Bruce Marshall.
 

1929 British novels
Novels by Bruce Marshall